Dry steering is the act of turning the steering wheel of a vehicle while the vehicle is stationary.

This action can be exceptionally difficult in the absence of power steering.

References

Automotive steering technologies